Ralf Matzka (born August 24, 1989 in Villingen-Schwenningen) is a German former professional cyclist, who rode professionally between 2008 and 2016.

Major results

2008
 1st Stage 4 Tour de Korea
 4th Rund um den Henninger Turm U23
 4th Tour de Berne
2010
 1st Stage 3 Flèche du Sud
2011
 2nd Road race, National Under-23 Road Championships
2012
 8th Overall Course de Solidarność et des Champions Olympiques
 9th Neuseen Classics
2013
 10th Rund um den Finanzplatz Eschborn-Frankfurt
2014
 4th Münsterland Giro
 8th Brussels Cycling Classic
2015
 6th Schaal Sels

References

External links

1989 births
Living people
German male cyclists
People from Villingen-Schwenningen
Cyclists from Baden-Württemberg
21st-century German people